Chayne Hultgren (born 13 April 1978), known professionally as the Space Cowboy is a world record-holding sideshow, street, and freak show performer.

Act

Hultgren performs a number of acts, including juggling a sickle, machete and fire torch, or a battle axe, jungle machete and a butcher knife, whilst blindfolded on a 10-foot unicycle, catching flaming arrows blindfolded shot from a crossbow, suspension (the art of dangling from hooks in the flesh), seven ball juggling, hat manipulation, spoon bending, levitation of himself and other objects, sword swallowing, psychic surgery, the Human Blockhead trick, knife throwing (with his girlfriend and performing partner Zoe Ellis). His theater act has included swallowing a  2000-volt neon glass tube with a microphone on the end, with his heartbeat audible as the light shines through his skin from the inside.

He has also toured his "Mutant Barnyard". His traveling tent show, displays his collection of historical freak show items including some of the world's most rare and unusual oddities.  These include his earliest item, Ditto, the double-bodied duckling, a two-headed cow named Daisy and Maisy, an albino kangaroo, extreme body modification skulls from Peru, shrunken heads from Ecuador and 18th century paintings of bearded women and a young child with lobster hands.  He regards this as a traveling "Museum of Mutations and Oddities". One of his latest acquisitions is what is claimed to be the genuine preserved head of Horace Ridler (a professional tattooed freak and sideshow performer better known as The Great Omi or The Zebra Man, who died in 1969). His collection is said to be insured by Lloyds Bank for 7 million dollars.

Hultgren has performed his shows in a variety of locations, including streets, theaters, the Sydney Opera House, the Sydney Royal Easter Show, the Edinburgh Festival Fringe, Glastonbury Festival, the Adelaide Festival of Arts, the Gentse Feesten (Ghent Festival in Belgium), the Rotterdam Straatfestival, the Toronto BuskerFest, the Woodford Folk Festival and the Edmonton International Street Performers Festival, Movie World.

Achievements
Hultgren is 'Australia's most prolific record breaker' and as of July 2016 he held 44 official 'Guinness World Records' for his unusual skills. Some of his records include: 'Most chainsaw juggling catches on a unicycle', 'Most weight dragged with hooks in the eye sockets', 'Most targets hit with throwing knives in one minute', 'Most swords swallowed underwater', 'Most blowtorches extinguished with the tongue in one minute (temperature of flames reached 1995 °C / 3623 °F)'. His achievement of swallowing 17 swords in 2009 was voted by Guinness World Records as one of the top 100 records of all time, since then he has broken this record many times and his current record for multiple sword swallowing is 27 swords swallowed at the same time. He is featured in many 'Guinness World Record' and 'Ripley's Believe It Or Not' books and TV shows. Bronze life cast statues of Hultgren swallowing swords are exhibited in the Ripley's Museums.

His first record broken was most swords swallowed (17 at once), then broke that record again, this time scoring 27 swords at the Irish Street Performance Festival (although this 27 swords record is unofficial) and on 8 February 2010 the BBC recorded that he broke this official world record by swallowing 18 swords.  He also broke the longest distance pulling 411 kg by fishhooks in his eye sockets.  He also holds the record for heaviest weight lifted while swallowing a sword.  Other records include 'Fastest arrow caught blindfolded', 'Most chainsaw juggling catches on a unicycle', 'Most motorbikes driven over the body while laying on a bed of nails', 'Most flowers whip cracked from the mouth in a minute.

Hultgren holds many "world firsts" such as first double sword swallow, first sword swallow underwater, and his signature trick "The Black and Decker Digestion Wrecker" a power drill with sword attachment which he swallows, and first person to publicly swallow a sword underwater in a tank of live sharks. He was also reported to be the youngest working sword-swallower in Australia, when he was 22 years old.

Hultgren is three times winner of the Street Performance World Championship.

He is a member of the International Brotherhood of Magicians and the Society of American Magicians.

Physical appearance

Hultgren is well known for his tattoos, which include large angel wings on his back.  People also remember him for his 11 piercings, which include nipple piercings, cartilage piercings, a flesh tunnel in his left ear and navel piercing.  He also has a subdermal implant in his chest which he acquired at Tusk tattoo shop in London. It was implanted by "Samppa Von Cyborg" a body modification aficionado.

Due to an internal deformation medically known as congenital division of the stomach, the lower half of his stomach has been replicated and sits lower than the average human stomach, allowing him to swallow longer swords. He can swallow the entire length of a 72 cm sword blade.

Media coverage

In June 2008 Hultgren was featured on the cover of national newspapers in the UK and Ireland, and on the BBC website when he broke a world record in Dublin by swallowing 27 swords decorated with the flags of all the countries in the European Union, on the day of the EU referendum on the Lisbon Treaty.

In 2008, The Times newspaper stated that the "Two-time world champion, quadruple Guinness World Record-holder, built out of muscle, tattoo ink and piercings, the Space Cowboy gathers crowds that nobody else in Edinburgh can muster without a seat on Mock the Week."

In 2009 Hultgren appeared on the Australian television show Australia's Got Talent.  His other TV appearances include Ripley's Believe It or Not! (USA), Don't Try This at Home (UK), The Sideshow (Australia), "Guinness O Mundo dos Recordes" (Spain) and "Lo show dei record" (Italian version of the Guinness World Records show). He later appeared in the US TV show The World's Best, but was eliminated in the first round. However, due to a shortage, he was brought back as a wild card, and once again was eliminated in the battle round.

In February 2010, his successful world record sword-swallowing attempt was covered by The Independent, USA Today, The Hindu and many other news media around the world.

In August 2011, he was arrested while performing on the streets in New York City for "brandishing a sword in public".  He was later released without charge after having his props confiscated.

Personal life
Hultgren lives in Byron Bay, Australia with his partner, Zoe Ellis (A.K.A: Zoe L'amore).  They have one daughter, Scarlett Showbiz Wild, born on 4 June 2013.

References

External links
 Space Cowboy @ Guinness World Records

1978 births
Living people
Sword swallowers
Sideshow performers
Jugglers
Edinburgh Festival performers
Australian buskers
People from the Northern Rivers
Australia's Got Talent contestants